Subgenus Iris is one subgenus of Iris.

Iris as a plant was originally named by Carl Linnaeus in his book Systema Naturae (in 1735), with a great number of species being added into the genus. Including new ones that were found after the book’s publication.
The division of irises into varies subgroups, has taken various forms over the years. By the 19th century botanists had created new genera such as Evansia, Hermodactylus, Moraea, Oncocyclus, and Xiphion. Opinion was often divided whether to split the genus into several parts or lump them back into Iris. From J. G. Baker, who separated some such as Moraea and Xiphion from Iris in his book 'Handbook of the Irideae' (published in London) in 1892. Then William R. Dykes, who clarified the situation by a compromise in his monograph The Genus Iris (by Cambridge University Press, 1913; later reprinted in 1974 by Dover). He was the first to term the subgroup as Iris sect. Iris.
G. Rodionenko's 1961 reclassification in The Genus Iris (written in Russian, Moscow, 1961) was more comprehensive in that he split the genus into five genera: Iris (which included all rhizomatous irises).
A taxonomic revision by Brian Mathew in 1981 (The iris, New York: Universe Books), recognized six subgenera: Nepalensis Dykes, Xiphium (Miller) Spach, Scorpiris Spach, Hermodactyloides Spach, Iris L. and Limniris Tausch. 
Recently, DNA analysis has been used to determine groupings.

The Iris subgenus has been divided into six sections; bearded irises (or pogon irises), Psammiris, Oncocyclus, Regelia, Hexapogon and Pseudoregelia. Sections Oncocyclus and Regelia are also called aril irises.

Section bearded irises (or pogon irises)

This is the largest section of the subgenus, the true bearded irises. Most irises come from Southern or eastern Europe. 'Pogon' refers to the Greek word for beard. It has several species of iris including; 
<div>

 Iris adriatica Trinajstic ex Mitic
 Iris albertii
 Iris albicans—white flag Iris, white cemetery iris.
 Iris alexeenkoi Grossh.
 Iris aphylla L.—stool iris, table iris, leafless iris.
 Iris aphylla subsp. hungarica Waldst. & Kit.) Hegi
 Iris attica (Boiss. & Heldr.) Hayek
 Iris benacensis A.Kern. ex Stapf
 Iris bicapitata Colas.
 Iris croatica—Perunika; endemic to Croatia.
 Iris cypriana Foster & Baker—endemic to Cyprus.
 Iris flavescens Delile—lemon-yellow iris 
 Iris florentina L.—syn: Iris germanica nothovar. florentina (L.) Dykes 
 Iris furcata Bieb.—forked iris.
 Iris × germanica L.—German iris (includes I. × barbata).
 Iris germanica nothovar. florentina Dykes
 Iris glaucescens Bunge
 Iris griffithii Baker
 Iris hellenica Mermygkas
 Iris illyrica (often included in I. pallida)—endemic to Balkan Peninsula.
 Iris imbricata Lindl.
 Iris junonia Schott ex Kotschy
 Iris kashmiriana Baker 
 Iris lutescens Lam. (including I. italica)
 Iris marsica I.Ricci & Colas.
 Iris mesopotamica—Mesopotamian iris
 Iris orjenii—Orjen iris
 Iris pallida—sweet iris, Dalmatian iris
 Iris pallida subsp. cengialti – Iris cengialti
 Iris perrieri Simonet ex P.Fourn.
 Iris pseudopumila Tineo
 Iris pumila L.
 Iris purpureobractea B.Mathew & T.Baytop
 Iris relicta Colas.
 Iris reichenbachii Heuff.—Reichenbach's iris
 Iris revoluta Colas.
 Iris sambucina L.
 Iris scariosa Willd. ex Link
 Iris schachtii Markgr.
 Iris suaveolens Boiss. & Reut. (including I. iliensis)
 Iris subbiflora Brot.
 Iris taochia Woronow ex Grossh.
 Iris timofejewii Woronow
 Iris variegata L.—Hungarian iris

</div>

It also includes thousands of ornamental plant cultivars, which have been divided into various height categories.
MDB – Miniature dwarf bearded 
SDB – Standard dwarf bearded
IB – Intermediate bearded
BB – Border bearded
MTB – Miniature tall bearded
TB – Tall bearded

Psammiris
This section of irises was first described by Spach.
Most of the Irises come from Russia and Northwest china. Mostly rhizomatous, and flowering in late spring.
'Psammiris' is derived from the Greek word  for sand.

It includes;
 Iris arenaria Waldst. and Kit.
 Iris bloudowii Bunge. 
 Iris curvifolia Zhao 
 Iris humilis Georgi
 Iris kamelinii Alexeeva
 Iris mandshurica Maxim.
 Iris potaninii Maxim.
 Iris vorobievii N.S.Pavlova

Oncocyclus

Oncocyclus irises are rhizomatous perennials. They also generally need rich soils that drain easy and are in full sun. Most also prefer a dry period after flowering. 
The Oncocyclus irises are mostly from Turkey, Caucasus and Iran. The flowers usually only have one flower, which is veined or spotted. Some of these species have been bred with bearded irises to create unique colours and markings. Oncocyclus is a Greek word, with onco meaning mass, or bulk, and cyclus meaning circle. In 1846, the term 'Oncocyclus' was first used by C.H. Siemssen as the Genus Oncocyclus in 1846 in Botanische Zeitung. Baker then re-classified it to a subgenus in 1877, than Dykes lowered it to a section in 1914, where it currently remains.
 Iris acutiloba C.A.Mey. (including I. ewbankiana )
Iris acutiloba subsp. lineolata (Trautvetter) Mathew and Wendlobo
Iris acutiloba subsp. longitepala Mathew & Zarrei 
 Iris antilibanotica Dinsmore
 Iris assadiana Chaudhary, Kirkw. & C.Weymolauth
 Iris auranitica Dinsmore
 Iris atrofusca Bak.
 Iris atropurpurea Bak.
 Iris barnumiae Bak. & Fost.
Iris barnumiae subsp. demawendica (Bornm.) B.Mathew & Wendelbo 
 Iris basaltica Dinsmore
 Iris bismarckiana Reg. – Nazareth iris
 Iris bostrensis Mouterde 
 Iris camillae Grossh.
 Iris cedreti Dinsm. ex Chaudhary
 Iris damascena Mouterde
 Iris gatesii Foster
 Iris grossheimii Woronow ex Grossh.
 Iris haynei Baker – Gilboa iris
 Iris heylandiana Boiss. & Reut.
 Iris hermona Dinsmore – Hermon iris
 Iris iberica Hoffm.Iris iberica subsp. elegantissima (Sosn.) Fed. & Takht.Iris iberica subsp. lycotis (Woronow) Takht.
 Iris kirkwoodi (including I. calcarea)
 Iris lortetii Barbey ex Boiss.
 Iris mariae Barbey.
 Iris meda Stapf
 Iris nigricans Dinsm.
 Iris paradoxa Steven
 Iris petrana Dinsm.
 Iris sari Schott ex Bak.
 Iris susiana L. – mourning iris
 Iris westii Dinsm.
 Iris yebrudii Dinsm. ex Chaud.

Regelia

Mostly from the mountainous regions of Iran, Afghanistan and the Altai Mountains. Most irises have a stem that has 2 flowers. It was named in 1904 by Robert Lynch in his book The Book of The Iris after Dr Regel.
 Iris afghanica Wend
 Iris darwasica Regel
 Iris heweri Grey-Wilson & B. Mathew
 Iris hoogiana Dykes
 Iris korolkowii Regel
 Iris kuschkensis Grey-Wilson & B. Mathew
 Iris lineata Foster ex Regel 
 Iris stolonifera Maxim.

Hybrids of Regelia irises and Oncocyclus irises are known as Regelicyclous.

Hexapogon
Mostly from the desert area of Central Asia, Iran and Afghanistan.
Most irises have beards on the falls and standards.
Note hexa refers to the number 6 and pogon refers to the Greek word for beard.
 Iris falcifolia Bunge
 Iris longiscapa Ledeb.

Pseudoregelia
Mostly from the mountainous regions of Eastern Asia.
Most irises have flowers that have blotches or colour spots on.
 Iris cuniculiformis Noltie & K.Y.Guan
 Iris dolichosiphon Noltie
 Iris goniocarpa Bak.
 Iris hookeriana Fost.
 Iris ivanovae Doronkin
 Iris kemaonensis Wall.
 Iris leptophylla Lingelsheim
 Iris narcissiflora Diels.
 Iris psammocola Y.T.Zhao
 Iris sikkimensis Dykes
 Iris tigridia'' Bunge ex Ledeb.

References

Iris (plant)
Plant subgenera